Prisoner abuse is the mistreatment of persons while they are under arrest or incarcerated. Prisoner abuse can include physical abuse, psychological abuse, sexual abuse, torture, or other acts such as refusal of essential medication.

Physical abuse 
Physical abuse of prisoners includes illicit beating and hitting of prisoners, unlawful corporal punishment, stress positions, and excessive or prolonged physical restraining.

According to the New York Times, along with physical abuse, prisoners are being thrown into jail for mental illnesses that they obtain and not being treated for them. This causes their issues to get worse and in some cases never get better. Also, relating to physical abuse the mentally ill can be thrown into restrained areas for a long amount of time because of their mental condition, this means that these mentally ill people do not have the resources to get better in the jail.

This is also caused by overpopulation in jails. Penal Reform International claims, that overcrowding in the main source of poor jail conditions globally. This caused overcrowding and understaffing: one of the reasons why there can sometimes be 2-3 people in the same jail cell for a long period of time. This causes a lack of privacy and because the jails are so overcrowded some minor cases are cut from the justice system altogether.

According to the Marshall Plan, there are also many gangs that are formed in different prisons which cause chaos and force the jail to go through many lockdowns which are a vulnerable time for the prison guards especially when they are understaffed. It also says that the prisoners and the prison guards have to be safe, which caused the guards to be defensive and sometimes abusive.

Psychological abuse 
Psychological abuse of prisoners can include verbal abuse, sleep deprivation, white noise, pointless/absurd or humiliating instructions, recurrent exhaustive inspections and shakedowns, arbitrary strip searches, and denuding actions.

According to Reflexions, prison can alter people's bodily dimensions, their emotional wellbeing, and possibly change their perception for an extended amount of time. It also claims that not only does the prison environment make mental disorders worse, but it also may cause them. The type of prison environment can be cruel and if the prisoner does not have the mental, emotional, and physical willpower they will struggle very greatly.

White noise
The endless playing of random static (similar to that of unused TV frequencies) with no pattern; this can cause extreme discomfort and disorientation.

Verbal abuse
Prisoners may be subject to taunting, heckling, profanity, and malicious lies by prison authorities. Guards and other authorities may use verbal abuse as a means of frightening or demoralizing prisoners to make them more compliant, or simply out of sadism.

Enablement of sexual violence
Prisoners are sometimes intentionally housed with inmates known to have raped other prisoners, or protection from known rapists may be purposely withheld from the prisoners. These practices create a very high incidence of rape in US prisons, which was the topic of the 2001 report No Escape from Human Rights Watch.

Sexual abuse
Sexual abuse is known to occur in facilities for both genders, however it is especially predominant with female prisoners. Common acts can include arbitrary and extensive strip searches as well as other forms of forced denudation beyond general necessity, excessive vaginal or rectal contraband searches or other internal checks including the oral cavity of a prisoner. In extreme cases even forced insertion of objects into the inmate's vagina or rectum and also forced sexual intercourse is known to occur mostly on female detainees.

Strip searches
The experience of forced strip searches can be experienced as a traumatic event similarly to that of rape especially by female prisoners, especially when combined with habitual body cavity searches. The prevalence of CCTV in modern correctional facilities and the generally indiscreet nature of strip searches, often with a number of prison guards observing, usually adds to the experienced humiliation. Strip searches are often arbitrarily used under various pretences, when the actual ambition is to assert control and predominance as well as to intimidate the subjected prison inmates.

Enemas
Forced enemas are commonly acknowledged as being uncomfortable and also degrading for the receiving person, especially when practiced in a prison environment designated by a stark imbalance in power. Such a treatment can also be registered as a form of physical abuse as well as sexual abuse, when practiced without consent or forcibly carried out against the will of the subjected prisoner. Physically invasive measures of this kind are often purposefully taken in order to demonstrate predominance and to assert "total control" over an incarcerated individual. By the application of a forced enema in a situation of incarceration one of the last remaining spheres of privacy as well as personal autonomy is stripped away from the prison inmate. As the prisoner's generally autonomous instances of bowel movement are hereby unnaturally taken out of his or her own decision-making and forcibly placed under the arbitration of prison authorities, "total control" over the inmate is implemented in a near finalizing manner. Therefore such a procedure can lead to experiences of emotional distress and psychological trauma for the defenceless detainee, which is typically desired by the authorities to undermine the prisoner's mental resilience.As a physical consequence of this practice, anal fissures, chronic hemorrhoids and rectal prolapse can occur when administered excessively and without medical care. Forced enemas have evidentially been used for example at the Guantanamo Bay detention camp by the United States. In certain cases it was administered under the pretence to counter a prisoner's dehydration. Forms of medical justification were employed whenever enemas were in fact used as a coercive tool. Despite the pretext of medical need, it was later admitted in certain cases, that this was in fact untrue. The CIA administered enemas to Khalid Sheik Mohammed, Mustafa al-Hawsawi and Mohammed al-Qahtani among others.

Torture
Torture of prisoners includes any act, whether physical or psychological, which is deliberately done to inflict sensations of pain upon a person under the actor's custody or physical control. This form of prisoner abuse is usually exerted to extract information, but also as means of intimidation, attrition or punishment.

Enhanced interrogation
"Enhanced interrogation" is a euphemism for U.S. torture methods implemented in the War on Terror purportedly needed to extract information from detainees. Examples include use of stress positions, sleep deprivation, starvation, thirst, and sexual humiliation.

Collective punishment
After a September 2020 incident inside the Scorpion Prison in the Tora Prison complex of Egypt, where four inmates and four officers died, the authorities opted to collectively punish all the 800-900 prisoners. They reconstructed all the cells into rooms of psychological torture, leaving no source of ventilation and electricity. The inmates were also strictly kept from communicating to the others.

Right to health
According to international laws, a State is liable to ensure prisoners’ right to receive health care. Prison authorities are fully responsible to provide proper medical treatment to the detainees and ensure their well-being.

COVID-19 pandemic
During the COVID-19 pandemic, the overcrowded Jaw prison of Bahrain witnessed a major COVID-19 outbreak. Several prisoners were confirmed to be infected with the virus, while the authorities failed to facilitate them with proper preventive medical supplies, including face masks or hand sanitizers, and conducting regular screening tests. The authorities fell short of ensuring prisoners’ rights to health and following the rules of treating prisoners. One of the main concerns had been the extensive population of the prison, which made social distancing impossible. On 9 June 2021, an inmate of Jaw prison, Husain Barakat, died due to COVID-19 complications. Even after the pandemic, Bahrain’s Jaw prison remained controversial, where prisoners’ rights of health continued to be violated. In June 2022, Amnesty International reported that Bahraini authorities failed to respond to the inmates suffering with tuberculosis. Prison authorities constantly disregarded the prisoners with symptoms and didn’t allow them to get tested for the airborne disease. Some of the prisoners were called back to the prison after they were confirmed of being infected in the hospital. One of the prisoners, Ahmed Jaber, was not sent to the hospital until he was semi-paralysed after being sick for 11 months.

See also
Abu Ghraib torture and prisoner abuse
Prisoner abuse in the United States
Prison overcrowding
Extermination through labor
Penal harm
Police misconduct
Prisoners' rights
Death in custody
Stun belt

References

Further reading
Gates, Madison L. and Robert K. Bradford. "The Impact of Incarceration on Obesity: Are Prisoners with Chronic Diseases Becoming Overweight and Obese during Their Confinement?" Journal of Obesity. 2015; 2015: 532468. Published online 2015 Mar 18. doi: 10.1155/2015/532468.

 
Penology
Abuse
Prison-related crime